Komagaksla (or Vatnafjellet) is the highest mountain on the island of Sørøya in Hammerfest Municipality in Troms og Finnmark county, Norway.

References

Hammerfest
Mountains of Troms og Finnmark